This media award was presented at the Angoulême International Comics Festival. It was given by different media over the years, with sometimes different awards in one year. From 2004 on, these awards are still presented at the time of the festival, but are no longer part of the official awards presented by the festival itself, and thus are excluded from this list.
Nominations are given beneath the winner, with indentation and without bold typeface.

1980s
 1981: Elle award: Hugo Pratt
 1982: TF1 award: Mohamed Aouamri
 1983: Press prize: RanXerox by Tanino Liberatore and Stefano Tamburini
 1984: Press prize: Bob Marone by Yann and Conrad
 1985: TF1 award: La balade du bout du monde by Makyo and Vicomte, Glénat
 (1986: no award in this category)
 1987: Antenne 2 award: Jefferson by Ptiluc
 1988: Antipode media award: Le Talis Balaouine by Marre and Carron
 1989: Antenne 2 award: Léonard by Turk and Bob de Groot, Le Lombard

1990s
 (1990: no award in this category)
 1991: Press prize: Les lumières de L’Amalou by Christophe Gibelin and Claire Wendling
 1991: France Info award: Le chemin de l’Amérique by Baru, Thévenet and Ledran, L'Écho des savanes/Albin Michel
 1992: France Info award: Le baron rouge by Georges Pratt
 1993: Press prize: Le bar du vieux Français by Jean-Philippe Stassen and Denis Lapière, Dupuis
 1993: France Info award: Les maîtres de l’orge part 1 by Valles and Jean Van Hamme, Glénat
 1994: France Info award: La fille aux ibis by Christian Lax and Giroud, Dupuis
 1995: France Info award: L’homme qui a fait le tour du monde by Aymond and Pierre Christin
 (1996: no award in this category)
 (1997: no award in this category)
 (1998: no award in this category)
 1999: Press prize: Azrayen part 1 by Christian Lax and Giroud, Dupuis
 1999: France Info award: Palestine part 2

2000s
 2000: France Info award: Passage en douce: Carnet d’errance by Klacokar, Fréon
 2001: France Info award: Déogratias by Jean-Philippe Stassen, Dupuis
 2001: Canal BD award: Réseau Bombyce by Cécil and Corbeyran, Les Humanoïdes Associés
 2002: Canal BD award: Isaac Le Pirate: Les Amériques by Christopher Blain, Dargaud
 Amours fragiles: Le dernier printemps by Beuriot and Richelle, Casterman
 Bouncer: Un diamant pour l’au-delà by François Boucq and Alejandro Jodorowsky, Les Humanoïdes Associés
 Le cri du peuple: Les canons du 18 mars by Jacques Tardi and Jean Vautrin, Casterman
 Le décalogue: Le manuscrit by J. Béhé and F. Giroud, Glénat
 Djinn: La favorite by A. Miralles and Jean Dufaux, Dargaud
 Gabrielle part 1 by Kara, Pointe Noire
 Ocean City: Torticolis et deltoïdes by Korowski and Chauvel, Delcourt
 Olives noires: Pourquoi cette nuit est différente des autres nuits? by E. Guibert and Joann Sfar, Dupuis
 Rural! by E. Davodeau, Delcourt
 Sur les traces d’Horus: Khaemonaset ou la loi de Maät by I. Dethan, Delcourt
 Tiresias: La révélation by C. Rossi and Serge Letendre, Casterman
 2003: France Info award: Carnets d’Orient part 6 by Jacques Ferrandez, Casterman
 2003: Canal BD award: Quartier lointain part 1 by Jiro Taniguchi, Casterman
 Algernon Woodcock part 1 by Sorel and Dieter
 Berlin, la cité des pierres part 1 by Jason
 Carnet d’Orient part 6 by Jacques Ferrandez
 Le chat du rabbin part 1 by Joann Sfar
 Jimmy Corrigan by Chris Ware
 El Niño part 1 by Perrissin and Pavlovic
 Phénomenum part 1 by Kaminka and Cédrines
 Le pouvoir des innocents part 5 by Hirn and Brunschwig
 Ring circus part 3 by Chauvel and Formosa
 Vitesse moderne by Blutch

Angoulême International Comics Festival